David Murray appears on hundreds of recordings as a leader and performer. This discography covers albums released under his name, by groups he was/is a member of and other albums he has contributed to. Dates are of recording, not release.

As leader/co-leader

As member 
Clarinet Summit
 In Concert at the Public Theatre (India Navigation, 1984)
 Southern Bells (Black Saint, 1987)

World Saxophone Quartet
See main article: World Saxophone Quartet

As sideman 

With James Blood Ulmer
 Are You Glad to Be in America? (Rough Trade/Artists House, 1980)
 Music Revelation Ensemble – No Wave (Moers Music, 1980)
 Free Lancing (Columbia, 1981)
 Music Revelation Ensemble (DIW, 1988)
 Music Revelation Ensemble, Elec. Jazz (DIW, 1990)
 Music Revelation Ensemble, After Dark (DIW, 1991)

With Conjure (Kip Hanrahan)
 Music for the Texts of Ishmael Reed (American Clavé, 1984)
 Cab Calloway Stands in for the Moon (American Clavé, 1988)

With Jack DeJohnette
 Special Edition (ECM, 1980)
 Album Album (ECM, 1984)

With Kahil El'Zabar
 One World Family (CIMP, 2000)
 Love Outside of Dreams (Delmark, 2002)
 We Is (Delmark, 2004)

With Kip Hanrahan
 Vertical's Currency (American Clavé, 1984)
 Days and Nights of Blue Luck Inverted (American Clavé, 1987)

With D.D. Jackson
 Peace Song (Justin Time, 1994)
 Paired Down (Jusin Time, 1996)

With McCoy Tyner
 Blues for Coltrane: A Tribute to John Coltrane (Impulse!, 1987)
 44th Street Suite (Red Baron, 1991)

With others
 Ted Daniel, In the Beginning (Altura Music, 1975)
 Michael Gregory Jackson, Clarity (Bija, 1976)
 Sunny Murray, Live at Moers Festival (Moers Music, 1979) – live
 Amiri Baraka, New Music New Poetry (India Navigation, 1980)
 Billy Bang, Outline No. 12 (OAO, 1981)
 Cold Sweat (Craig Harris), Cold Sweat Plays J. B. (JMT, 1989)
 Ralph Peterson, Presents the Fo'tet (Blue Note, 1989)
 Bobby Battle Quartet with David Murray, The Offering (Mapleshade,1990)
 The Bob Thiele Collective, Sunrise Sunset (Red Baron, 1990)
 Teresa Brewer, Softly I Sing (Red Baron, 1991)
 Andrew Cyrille Quintet, Ode to the Living Tree (Venus, 1995) – recorded in 1994
 Steve Coleman and Five Elements, Curves of Life (Live at the Hot Brass)(Novus/BMG, 1995) – live. featuring Murray on 2 tracks.
 Jim Nolet, With You (KFW, 1995)
 Kansas City Soundtrack (Verve, 1995)
 Ozay, Antiquated Love (Sagen, 1995)
 Jon Jang Sextet, Two Flowers on a Stem (Soul Note, 1996)
 The Roots, Illadelph Halflife (DGC, Geffen, 1996)
 Hugh Ragin, An Afternoon in Harlem (Justin Time, 1999)
 Balogh Kálmán David Murray, Gipsy Cimbalom Band, Balogh Kálmán Featuring Kovács Ferenc (Fonó, 2004)
 James Carter, Live at Baker's Keyboard Lounge (Warner Bros., 2004) – live recorded in 2001
 Henry Grimes, Live at the Kerava Jazz Festival with Hamid Drake (Ayler, 2005) – live recorded in 2004

  

Discographies of American artists
Jazz discographies